Fredericka "Marm" Mandelbaum (March 25, 1825 – February 26, 1894)
 operated as a criminal fence to many of the street gangs and criminals of New York's underworld, handling between $1–5 million in stolen goods between 1862 and 1884. Like her principal rival John D. Grady and the Grady Gang, she also became a matriarch to the criminal elements of the city and was involved in financing and organizing numerous burglaries and other criminal operations throughout the post-American Civil War era.

Life and career 

Mandelbaum was born Friederike Weisner in Kassel, a city in modern-day Germany. Not much is known of her early life, other than that her family was Jewish. She married Wolfe Mandelbaum in 1848; they worked as itinerant peddlers in Germany before emigrating to the United States in 1850.

When the family arrived in New York, they began a series of small businesses, taking in goods collected by scavengers and reselling them. The pair purchased a dry goods store on Clinton Street, but by 1854, the business was operating as a front for the Mandelbaums' criminal operations (she would later need to store goods in two large warehouses in the city). Mandelbaum began financing thieves and burglars and was involved in planning some of the biggest thefts in the city's history, including the Manhattan Savings Bank Robbery. Expanding her operations, she controlled several gangs of blackmailers and confidence men as well as a school, known as Marm's Grand Street School, to recruit and teach younger criminals how to pickpocket. She was also a top competitor to the Grady Gang.

During this time, she had become one of New York's most prominent hostesses of New York's high society, as well as the underworld, regularly associating with some of the most well-known criminals of the day including Queen Liz, Big Mary, "Black" Lena Kleinschmidt, Adam Worth, Sophie Lyons, and George Leonidas Leslie as well as judges and police officials.

However, in 1884, New York District Attorney Peter B. Olney hired the Pinkerton Detective Agency to infiltrate Mandelbaum's organization. An agent, posing as a prospective thief, arranged to have several marked bolts of silk stolen from a store where it was discovered in a police raid on her home the following morning. Arrested with her son Julius and clerk Herman Stroude, Mandelbaum was released on bail and fled the United States with an estimated $1 million. She settled in Hamilton, Ontario where she remained until her death in 1894.

References

Sources 

 Asbury, Herbert. The Gangs of New York. New York: Alfred A. Knopf, 1927. 
 Sifakis, Carl. The Encyclopedia of American Crime. New York: Facts on File Inc., 2001. 
 Phillips, Charles and Alan Axelrod. Cops, Crooks, and Criminologists: An International Biographical Dictionary of Law Enforcement, Updated Edition. New York: Checkmark Books, 2000.

Further reading 
 Asbury, Herbert. All around the town: The Sequel to the Gangs of New York. New York: Alfred A. Knoff, 1929. 
 
 Lardner, James and Thomas Reppetto. NYPD: A City and Its Police. New York: Henry Holt & Co., 2000. 
 Ben Macintyre, "The Napoleon of Crime; The Life and Times of Adam Worth, Master Thief," 1997.

External links 
 Adam Worth: The World in his Pocket - Marm Mandelbaum by Joseph Geringer
 Frederika "Ma" Mandlebaum at Rotten.com
 The Sins of New York: As "Exposed" by the Police Gazette by Edward Van Emery
 WNYC - The Next Big Thing: Out Laws (Queen of Fences)
 "Marm - A Gilded Age Mastermind" by William Bryk - New York Sun - December 22, 2004

1825 births
1894 deaths
American crime bosses
Gang members of New York City
German emigrants to the United States
American female organized crime figures
19th-century American criminals
Jewish women in business
Jewish women
Jewish American gangsters